Pooky or Pookie may refer to:

Fictional characters
 Pooky (Garfield character), the teddy bear belonging to Garfield in the comic strip and cartoon
 Pooky, a large, snake-like creature in Stephen King's 2012 novel The Dark Tower: The Wind Through the Keyhole
 Angela Montenegro, real name Pookie Gibbons, in the TV series Bones
 Pookie the Lion, a hand puppet on the Soupy Sales television show
 Pookie, in the movie New Jack City
 Pookie, Arnold's grandmother in Hey Arnold!, a Nickelodeon animated television series
 Pookie, a rabbit with wings in a series of children's books by Ivy Wallace
 Pookie Jones, in the comic strip Popeye

Other uses:
 Mr. Pookie, rapper
 Pookie (vehicle), a Rhodesian mine-detecting vehicle
 Pooky Quesnel (born 1964), English actress, screenwriter and singer
 The Sterile Cuckoo, a 1969 film released in the UK as Pookie
 Pooky, in the documentary TV series Meerkat Manor - see List of Meerkat Manor meerkats
 Pooky, an open source project on SourceForge building multi-touch software
 Pookie, a brand name for a mastic based duct sealant (UL 181 A-M or 181 B-M rated) Ductwork airtightness#Duct sealing or duct tightening

See also
 Pooky Night, an alternate name for Halloween in some parts of Ireland